Star Bright or Starbright may refer to:

Music

Albums 
 Star Bright (Vanessa Williams album), 1996
 Star Bright (Dizzy Reece album), 1960
 Starbright, album by Pat Marino, 1976
 Starbright, album by Clare Fischer and Gary Foster, 1983
 Starbright, album by Linda Womack, 1986
 Starbright, album by Herbert Guðmundsson, 2018

Songs 
 "Starbright" (Johnny Mathis song)
 "Starbright", song by Quietdrive from the album Deliverance
 "Starbright", song by Keith Jarrett from the album Facing You
 "Starbright", song by Peter McLean
 "Starbrite", song by Jeff St John, 1985
 "Starbrite", song by Ringside from the album Lost Days, 2011

People 
 Jack Starbright, a character from the Alex Rider novels and television series

Organizations and groups 
 Starbright World, an online community for children with chronic illnesses, developed by Starbright Foundation
 Miami Dolphins Starbrites, former name for the Miami Dolphins Cheerleaders
 Starbrite Cleaners, a fictional business from the television show Strip Mall
 Starbrite SC, a youth association football club started by Malaysian footballer R. Arumugam

Other uses 
 Star Bright, a 1980 science-fiction novel by Martin Caidin.
 "Star Bright", a 1952 short story by Mark Clifton
 SS-N-7 Starbright, NATO reporting name for the P-70 Ametist anti-shipping missile

See also
 Star Light, Star Bright, an English language nursery rhyme
 Apparent magnitude, a measurement of brightness of stars and astronomical objects as seen from Earth
 Bright Star (disambiguation)
 "Starbright Boy", a song by Bis from the album The New Transistor Heroes, 1997